Amanda Ramirez (Amanda-Jane Ramirez) is Professor of Liaison Psychiatry, director of the Promoting Early Presentation Group at King's College London, director of Informed Choice about Cancer Screening at King's Health Partners and National Clinical Lead for Cancer Patient Information, National Cancer Action Team, now part of  NHS Improving Quality.

She earned her medical degree at UCL Medical School and trained as a psychiatrist at Guys and St Thomas’ NHS Foundation Trust.

Ramirez co-authored the NICE guidance on Supportive and Palliative Care (2004), writing on improving patient information, face-to-face communication and psychological support.

She is a Fellow of the Royal College of Psychiatrists.

Selected publications

References

External links 
 
 PubMed search - Amanda-Jane Ramirez

British women academics
Academics of King's College London
Living people
British psychiatrists
British women psychiatrists
Year of birth missing (living people)

Alumni of the UCL Medical School
Fellows of the Royal College of Psychiatrists